PB-25 Kech-I is a constituency of the Provincial Assembly of Balochistan.

See also

 PB-24 Gwadar
 PB-26 Kech-II

References

External links
 Election commission Pakistan's official website
 Awazoday.com check result
 Balochistan's Assembly official site

Constituencies of Balochistan